Fatih Harbiye ("In Between") is a Turkish television series that aired from August 2013 to December 2014.

Synopsis 

The show is based on the novel with the same title written by Peyami Safa.

The TV show presents two sides of Istanbul: In Fatih, a poor neighborhood, Neriman Sölmaz has dreams of becoming a famous artist. She leaves university in her third year while her childhood friend Şinasi who is in love with her, goes to study music.

Harbiye, Beyoğlu, is an upper class, modern European neighborhood where Macit Arcaoğlu lives. Macit is the son of an artist İnci and a businessman Kerim.

Kerim wants Macit to marry his friend Selim Demirhan's daughter Pelin.

Selim is the brother of Neriman's mother Nazan, but due to a feud between Neriman's father Faiz and Selim, they don't have contact to each other. Selim has two daughters Pelin and Duygu. One day Neriman and her best friend Fahriye meet them and are invited to a party at Macit's house.

Neriman goes to the party, and she meets Macit there. Macit falls in love with Neriman at first sight and takes her to a boat to be alone with her. Neriman is scared because of what happened to Şinasi's sister Aslı. She falls into the water and Macit saves her life. After that day they start seeing each other and falling in love with each other. Much to the dislike of Pelin who is in love with Macit herself.

Cast

International broadcasting

References

External links 
 

Turkish television series
Turkish drama television series
2013 Turkish television series debuts
2014 Turkish television series endings
Show TV original programming
Fox (Turkish TV channel) original programming
Television series produced in Istanbul
Television shows set in Istanbul
Television series set in the 2010s